Antanas Maceina (27 January 1908 – 27 January 1987) was a Lithuanian philosopher, existentialist, educator, theologian, and poet.

Developed philosophy of culture of Stasys Šalkauskis, adjusted Christian philosophy and existentialism, accented an importance of native language to education.

References 

1908 births
1987 deaths
People from Prienai District Municipality
Lithuanian educators
Lithuanian Catholic poets
Christian existentialists
20th-century  Lithuanian  philosophers
20th-century poets